The 1966 South Pacific Games was the second games where football was played and was held in New Caledonia during December 1966. In the final, Tahiti upset all predictions by defeating New Caledonia by 2–0.

Group stage

Group 1

Group 2

Semi finals

Bronze medal match

Gold medal match

Sources

1966
Pac
P
Football at the Pacific Games
1966 Pacific Games